Nguyễn Hữu An (October 1, 1926 – April 9, 1995) was a general in the People's Army of Vietnam.

Overview
Nguyễn Hữu An was born in the Truong Yen Commune of the Hoa Lư District, Ninh Bình, Vietnam. He joined the People's Army of Vietnam in September 1945.

First Indochina War
In the First Indochina War, An took part in several decisive battles. He participated in the battles of Bong Lau Pass and Lung Phay in 1949. The following year he took part in the Border Campaign, he was commander of 251st Battalion, a battalion of 174th Regiment (CAA Bac Lang) at the Battle of Đông Khê. He successively held titles of battalion commander, regiment deputy commander participating in actions at Bình Liêu, Vĩnh Phúc, and Mộc Châu. In the Battle of Dien Bien Phu, he commanded 174th Regiment of the 316th Division, and three times attacked Hill A1 (Éliane 2). On 7 May 1954 his regiment finally overcame French defences on A1 and this marked one of the final actions in the battle.

Vietnam War
In the Vietnam War, He commanded North Vietnamese forces in the Battle of Ia Drang. In 1974 he was promoted to major general.

In the 1975 Spring Offensive, Major General Nguyen Huu An was Commander of 2nd Corps (Hương Giang). 2nd Corps, under his command, successively captured Quảng Trị and Huế; and in combination with armed forces of Military Region No.5 defeated nearly 100,000 regular troops of the ARVN within just 3 days at Da Nang. He then commanded the entire corps to march along nearly 1000 km to engage in the Ho Chi Minh Campaign after having destroyed the ARVN defensive line in Phan Rang.

In the last decisive fight to capture Saigon, 2nd Corps was one of five wings to surround Saigon, and planted the National Liberation Front's flag onto top of the Independence Palace at 11:30 on 30 April 1975.

Postwar career
After the end of the Vietnam War, An continued serving in the Vietnamese military. He achieved the rank of Lieutenant General in 1980. Six years later, he was promoted to Senior Lieutenant General (Colonel General). He held key posts in military such as Assistant Inspector General of the Vietnam People's Army, Deputy Chief concurrently Chief of Staff and Acting Commander of Military Region No.2 (1984–1987), Director of Army Academy (1988–1991), and Director of Academy of National Defense (1991–1995). He died in 1995.

He was called the "General of Battles" by the famed General Võ Nguyên Giáp.

Awards
The Communist Party of Vietnam and State of Vietnam awarded him with:
Independence Order of First-Class
Two Military Exploits Orders of First-Class
Military Exploits Order of Third-Class
Liberation Military Exploits Order of Third-Class
Two Exploits Orders of First and Second-Class
Victory Order of Second-Class

In popular culture
Nguyễn is portrayed by actor Đơn Dương in the 2002 film We Were Soldiers.

Notes

Book references
 Vietnamese
Đường tới Điện Biên Phủ (Đại tướng Võ Nguyên Giáp) – Nhà xuất bản Quân đội nhân dân
Chiến trường mới (Thượng tướng Nguyễn Hữu An) – Nhà xuất bản Quân đội nhân dân
Lịch sử kháng chiến chống Mỹ cứu nước 1954–1975 (Viện lịch sử quân sự Việt Nam) – Nhà xuất bản Chính trị quốc gia
Điện Biên Phủ qua những trang hồi ức (Nhiều tác giả) – Nhà xuất bản Quân đội nhân dân
Ký ức Tây Nguyên (Thượng tướng Đặng Vũ Hiệp) – Nhà xuất bản Quân đội nhân dân
Tổng hành dinh trong mùa xuân toàn thắng (Đại tướng Võ Nguyên Giáp) – Nhà xuất bản Chính trị quốc gia
Nguyễn Hữu An – Vị tướng trận mạc (Hội Khoa học Lịch sử Việt nam) – Trung tâm UNESCO bảo tồn và phát triển văn hóa dân tộc Việt nam

1926 births
1995 deaths
People from Ninh Bình province
Generals of the People's Army of Vietnam
North Vietnamese military personnel of the Vietnam War
Vietnamese communists